Sphaerophoria asymmetrica  ( Knutson, 1972 ), the asymmetric globetail , is a common species of syrphid fly observed across northern North America. Hoverflies can remain nearly motionless in flight. The adults are also known as flower flies for they are commonly found on flowers from which they get both energy-giving nectar and protein rich pollen. The larvae feed on aphids.

References

Diptera of North America
Syrphinae
Syrphini
Hoverflies of North America
Insects described in 1972